Caroline Coventry Haynes (13 April 1858 – 4 September 1951) was an American bryologist and painter, known for her study of liverworts and other hepatics.

References

1858 births
1951 deaths
American women scientists
American women painters
Bryologists